West Bali National Park (Indonesian: Taman Nasional Bali Barat) is a national park located in Buleleng Regency, Bali, Indonesia. This is approximately 3% of Bali's total land area. A seaport at Gilimanuk is west of the park, and the village of Goris is to the east. The National Park can be reached by roads from Gilimanuk and Singaraja, or by using ferries from Ketapang, East Java.

There are several habitats in the national park, a savanna, mangroves, montane and mixed-monsoon forests, and coral islands. The center of the park is dominated by remnants of four volcanic mountains from Pleistocene era, with Gunung Patas at  its highest elevation.

Flora and fauna

Some 160 animal species can be found inside the park. Mammals include the banteng, rusa deer, Indian muntjac, Javan lutung, wild boar, large flying fox and leopard cat. Birds include crested serpent-eagle, milky stork, savanna nightjar, barn swallow, Pacific swallow, red-rumped swallow, crested treeswift, dollarbird, black-naped oriole, Java sparrow, lesser adjutant, long-tailed shrike, black racket-tailed treepie, sacred kingfisher, stork-billed kingfisher, yellow-vented bulbul and the critically endangered Bali myna. Reptiles include hawksbill turtle and water monitor.

In June 2011, West Bali National Park received forty Bali mynas released from Surabaya Zoo and twenty from Taman Safari Indonesia.

Plant species known to grow in this national park include: Pterospermum diversifolium, Antidesma bunius, Lagerstroemia speciosa, Steleochocarpus burahol, Santalum album, Aleurites moluccanus, Sterculia foetida, Schleichera oleosa, Dipterocarpus hasseltii, Garcinia dulcis, Alstonia scholaris, Manilkara kauki, Dalbergia latifolia and Cassia fistula.

Extinct
 The last Bali tigers were positively recorded in western Bali in the 1930s.

See also 

 Geography of Indonesia

Gallery

References

External links 

  

National parks of Indonesia
Geography of Bali
Tourist attractions in Bali